Identification of a Woman is a 1982 Italian–French drama film directed by Michelangelo Antonioni and starring Tomás Milián, Daniela Silverio, and Christine Boisson. It was awarded the 35th Anniversary Prize at the 1982 Cannes Film Festival.

Plot

The existence of Niccolò, a film director living in Rome, is empty. He has no new film to make, no woman in his life, and his only family is his sister, a gynaecologist, and her little son. He approaches one of his sister's patients, a beautiful young aristocrat called Mavi, and the two start a passionate affair.

It proves empty, since Niccolò has no interest in her family and titled friends, a feeling they reciprocate, and introduces her to no friends of his. Worse,  Niccolò finds he is under surveillance and is even explicitly warned off Mavi. Who these threats emerge from she does not say and he never finds out. To escape his shadowers in Rome, he takes Mavi out to an old farmhouse he has rented, but the drive there through fog is traumatic and they quarrel violently. In the morning Mavi has vanished. Searching for her back in Rome, the only friend of hers who will talk to him warns Niccolò that Mavi is bisexual and hints at a jealous past lover.

Wanting company and affection, Niccolò meets a young stage actress called Ida, slim and athletic like Mavi, a working-class girl who loves the country and is not brittle or mysterious but utterly open. While she is happy to sleep with him, she realises that he is still longing for Mavi and sets him on the trail to find her present address. Listening on the stairs, Niccolò hears Mavi tell the girl with whom she shares a flat that she must keep on hiding from him.

Accepting at last that Mavi will never come back, he takes Ida for a romantic holiday in Venice. There she gets a phone call from her doctor in Rome, who confirms that she is pregnant. Delicately, she tells Niccolò that she does love him but her loyalty must now be to the father of the baby.

Back alone in Rome, Niccolò starts musing about his next film. He imagines a spaceship built of asteroid material that could approach the sun. He recalls telling his young nephew about space travel, saying, "The day mankind understands what the sun is made of and its power, perhaps we'll understand the entire universe and the reasons behind so many things." His nephew responds, "And then?"

Cast

 Tomás Milián as Niccolò
 Daniela Silverio as Mavi
 Christine Boisson as Ida
 Lara Wendel as Girl at swimming pool
 Veronica Lazar as Carla
 Enrica Antonioni as Nadia 
 Sandra Monteleoni as Mavi's sister
 Marcel Bozzuffi as Mario
 Gianpaolo Saccarola as The gorilla
 Arianna De Rosa as Mavi's friend
 Dado Ruspoli as Mavi's father 
 Carlos Alberto Valles as Close-up man
 Sergio Tardioli as Butcher
 Itaco Nardulli as Lucio
 Paola Dominguín as Girl in window

Production and release
Identification of a Woman was shot in Rome and Venice and premiered at the 1982 Cannes Film Festival on 13 May, where it was awarded the 35th Anniversary Prize.

Reception
Initial critical reactions to the film were mixed. To German critic Hans-Christoph Blumenberg (Die Zeit), Identification of a Woman looked as if it had been produced by Italy's consumer goods industry for the sophisticated taste: "so cool, so chique, so expensive".
In his 1982 review for the New York Times, Vincent Canby called the film "an excruciatingly empty work" and "beautiful and sad—virtually a parody of the director's great L'Avventura and some of his other earlier films." 

In an October 2011 essay published to accompany a release of a Criterion Collection edition, critic John Powers pointed out that the film had been made when Antonioni was nearing seventy: "this is one of those autumnal movies—think Rio Bravo or An Autumn Afternoon—in which an aging director allows himself to be more relaxed and genial than in his most finely tuned work. Far from serving up a major statement about the human condition—something Antonioni was never shy about doing—Identification of a Woman comes tinged with modesty and irony. His first feature set in Italy since 1964’s Red Desert, it finds him taking a provisional measure of how the modern world has been shifting around him."

References

External links
 
 
 

1982 films
1980s Italian-language films
1982 drama films
Films set in Italy
Films about film directors and producers
Films directed by Michelangelo Antonioni
Films with screenplays by Tonino Guerra
Italian drama films
French drama films
1980s Italian films
1980s French films